Bowl-A-Rama was a skateboarding event held annually at Bondi Beach until 2018, and previously Wellington until 2014 and once in New York City in 2012. Founded in 2005, it was the richest skateboard competition in terms of prize money in Australia and New Zealand and was broadcast live on Fuel TV Australia. Vans held the naming rights to the event until 2018 when General Pants Co. Bowl-A-Rama.

The event was last held in 2018 at Bondi Beach. The 2019 event was rescheduled to 2020, however the event did not go ahead.

Past winners

2018 RESULTS

MEN'S DIVISION 
1st: Keegan Palmer (AUS)

2nd: Jono Schwan (USA)

3rd: Tom Schaar (USA)

WOMEN'S DIVISION 
1st: Sabre Norris (AUS)

2nd: Jordyn Barratt (USA)

3rd: Poppy Starr Olsen (AUS)

MASTERS DIVISION 
1st: Tony Hawk (USA)

2nd: Pat Ngoho (USA)

3rd: Nicky Guerrero (DEN)

JUNIOR DIVISION 
1st: Tate Carew (USA)

2nd: Dylan Donnini (AUS)

3rd: Jed Ragen (AUS)

2017 RESULTS

MEN'S DIVISION 
1st: Cory Juneau (USA)

2nd: Tom Schaar (USA)

3rd: Jono Schwan (USA)

WOMEN'S DIVISION 
1st: Jordyn Barratt (USA)

2nd: Brighton Zeuner (USA)

3rd: Poppy Olsen (AUS)

MASTERS DIVISION 
1st: Steve Caballero (USA)

2nd: Tony Hawk (USA)

3rd: Pat Ngoho (USA)

JUNIOR RESULTS 
1st: Keegan Palmer (AUS)

2nd: Tate Carew (USA)

3rd: Taylor Nye (USA)

2016 RESULTS 
MASTERS DIVISION

1st: Tony Hawk (USA)

2nd: Pat Ngoho (USA)

3rd: Renton Millar (AUS)

MEN'S DIVISION

1st: Bucky Lasek (USA)

2nd: Cory Juneau (USA)

3rd: Tom Schaar (USA)

References

External links
 
 

2012 in sports in New York City
Bondi, New South Wales
Skateboarding competitions
Sport in Wellington
Sports competitions in Sydney
Sports competitions in New York City
Recurring sporting events established in 2004